Nowa Wieś  is a village in the administrative district of Gmina Trzcianne, within Mońki County, Podlaskie Voivodeship, in north-eastern Poland.

According to the 1921 census, the village was inhabited by 767 people, among whom 762 were Roman Catholic, and 5 Mosaic. At the same time, 767 inhabitants declared Polish nationality and 5 Jewish. There were 132 residential buildings in the village.

The village has a population of 575.

References

Villages in Mońki County